Giulio Vaccaro (Naples, 10 April 1851 – Bari, 10 March 1924) was an Italian Catholic archbishop.

Biography
Doctor in sacred theology and canon law, for many years he was vicar general of the diocese of Nusco. On 4 June 1891, just forty years old, he was named bishop of Trivento.

On 6 December 1896 he left Trivento's seat to become the coadjutor of then Archbishop of Trani Domenico Marinangeli. At the same time, Ancyra's archbishop's seat was assigned to him.

With the Pontifical Bubble of 24 March 1898, he was appointed Archbishop of the Archdiocese of Bari and Canosa and made his entry to Bari on 5 June the same year, after having taken over the office by a prosecutor.

During his long stay in Bari, he carried out intensive pastoral activity, constantly urging the clergy and the faithful to work in the educational and social field. She addressed many diocesan letters to the diocese, from which her whole commitment was directed, especially to promote vocations, to spread religious education, and to lead a morally healthy life. From 1902 to 1912 he promoted several congresses, concretizing spiritual and social initiatives throughout the whole of Apulia. He contributed to the erection in Bari of a civilian hospital by donating a 200,000 lire contribution and subsidized families affected by the floods that fell on the city from 1905 to 1915.

In 1907 he received a pastoral visit from Father Ernesto Bresciani, who noted the ignorance in the religious field, the spread of immorality, the favor met by modernism among young priests. For this reason, he later showed much more firmness in exerting the presence of priests in the "Congregations of the moral cases", imposing also heavy absences.

One of its greatest merits is the decoration of the cathedral, by the refurbishment of the floor, the provision of an organ that was his personal gift, the restoration of the dome (during the execution of the work, unknown thieves robbed the painting of Our Lady of Constantinople some precious objects, which the faithful hurried to replace with generous offers). It is necessary for him to establish new town parishes, such as St. Joseph, Carmel, Santa Cecilia, Redentore, San Pasquale, SS. Sacramento, of St. James, in addition to the various other buildings in the centers near the capital. When the Archbishop's seminary was repaired at his expense, he made efforts to erect the regional seminar.

It was extinguished on 10 March 1924 and was buried in the chapel of the metropolitan chapter in the cemetery of Bari. On 5 November 1939 the body was transplanted from the town cemetery to the church of San Giuseppe to the Madonnella district where a monument was erected in his honor. He is still devoted to the road that leads from the church of St. Joseph to the Lungomare.

References

1851 births
1924 deaths
19th-century Italian Roman Catholic archbishops